The 1974 Campeonato Nacional de Fútbol Profesional was the Chilean football top tier's 42nd season. Huachipato was the tournament's champion. It was its first ever top-level title.

Standing

Scores

Top goalscorers

Liguilla Pre-Copa Libertadores

Final play-off

Unión Española also qualified for the 1975 Copa Libertadores

See also
 1974 Copa Chile

References

External links
ANFP 

Primera División de Chile seasons
Chile
Prim